USS Romulus (ARL-22) was laid down as a United States Navy  but converted to one of 39 s that were used for repairing landing craft during World War II. Named for Romulus (along with Remus, one of the legendary twin sons of Mars and the Vestal Rhea Silvia), she was the only US Naval vessel to bear the name.

Construction
LST-962 was laid down on 17 October 1944, at Hingham, Massachusetts, by the Bethlehem-Hingham Shipyard; launched 15 November 1944; and commissioned 9 December 1944. On 10 December LST-962 shifted to the Boston Navy Yard, and on 11 December, departed for Jacksonville, Florida, where she entered the Gibbs Gas Engine Works yard for conversion to a landing craft repair ship (ARL). Decommissioned on 8 January 1945, she was recommissioned on 10 May, as Romulus (ARL-22).

Service history

World War II
After shakedown, Romulus sailed for the Pacific. Transiting the Panama Canal in late June, she reached the Marianas in August, and for a short time tended and repaired landing craft at Apra Harbor, Guam, and Tanapag Harbor, Saipan. In early September, she continued west. From 25 September 1945 to 3 September 1946, she provided tender and repair services at the Yokosuka Naval Base, Honshū, Japan. Then ordered to Okinawa, she served in a similar capacity at Buckner Bay into December. Departing the Ryukyus early in the month, she visited Hong Kong, then continued on to the United States. Arriving at San Pedro, Los Angeles on 3 February 1947, she was decommissioned on 12 May, and berthed with the Pacific Reserve Fleet at San Diego.

Korean War
Recommissioned at San Diego, on 2 April 1952, Romulus remained on the west coast until January 1953. On 31 January, she sailed for the Far East, arriving at Yokosuka, on 6 March. Operations servicing amphibious ships then took the ARL to the ports of Nagoya, Sasebo, Buckner Bay, and Nagasaki. At the end of May, she shifted to Inchon, Korea, where she was assigned station ship and repair facility duty in support of UN forces in the area. Back in Japan from mid–June through July, she again served UN forces at Inchon from 2–26 August. She departed Yokosuka, on 6 September, and returned to San Diego, on 5 October. Romulus remained in the 1st Fleet until 3 January 1955, when she sailed once more for Yokosuka and Sasebo, Japan, and her last tender duty with the 7th Fleet. Returning to San Diego, on 27 April, Romulus briefly operated there, then prepared for inactivation.

In January 1956, she steamed to Astoria, Oregon. Six months later, on 1 June 1956, she was decommissioned and berthed with the Columbia River Group, Pacific Reserve Fleet. Struck from the Naval Vessel Register on 1 October 1960, she was transferred, under the terms of the Military Assistance Program, to the Republic of the Philippines in November 1961, and recommissioned as BRP Aklan (AR-67). Renamed Kamagong in 1975, the repair ship remained in the Philippine Navy until retired in 1989.

Awards
Romulus earned one battle star during the Korean War.

References

Bibliography

External links
 

 

Achelous-class repair ships
Achelous-class repair ships converted from LST-542-class ships
World War II auxiliary ships of the United States
Cold War auxiliary ships of the United States
Korean War auxiliary ships of the United States
Ships built in Hingham, Massachusetts
1944 ships
Ships transferred from the United States Navy to the Philippine Navy